Code for Africa is a technology and data journalism nonprofit based in Nairobi, Kenya.

Background 
Code for Africa was founded by Justin Arenstein in 2012 to develop resources to make data more accessible. Code for Africa creates projects and training to enable data journalism and make fact-checking and forensic data analysis tools accessible to journalists and citizens. Code for Africa also organizes trainings for data journalism.

In 2015, Code for Africa received $4.7m from the Bill & Melinda Gates Foundation to fund data projects in Kenya, Nigeria, South Africa and Tanzania on health and development journalism.

In 2016, Code for Africa launched impactAFRICA Data Journalism Fund worth $500,000 with the International Center for Journalists, and funding from Bill & Melinda Gates Foundation, and the World Bank.

In 2017, Google announced a training in collaboration with Code for Africa and World Bank for data journalism. In 2019, the Nigeria's National Bureau of Statistics worked with Code for Africa in the publication of data as open data. During the 2020 COVID-19 pandemic, Deutsche Welle partnered with Code for Africa to set up fact-checking in various Kenyan media houses.

See also 

 Code for America
 Civic technology companies
 Civic technology

References 

Politics and technology
Open government